The PP-91 KEDR is a 9mm machine pistol developed from a prototype from the 1970s and since 1994 adopted by the Russian Ministry of Internal Affairs.

Overview
The PP-91 is a simply designed, easy to manufacture selective fire submachine gun designed by Yevgeny Dragunov (the designer of the SVD sniper rifle).

It is blowback operated and fires from a closed bolt, allowing for more accurate shooting than would be possible from an open bolt design. Ammunition is fed from a double column box magazine and it is supplied with folding shoulder stock.

Constructed from stamped sheet steel, it weighs in near 1.57 kg. The safety/selector lever is located on the right hand side and allows for semi-automatic single shots and fully automatic fire at the rate of 800 rounds per minute. The effective range of the PP-91 is between 50-100m. The weapon uses a diopter sight and allows for the use of a laser sight and a suppressor.

Variants
 PP-71 (ПП-71) - a prototype SMG developed for the Ministry of Defense in the framework of the ROC "Bouquet" and tested in 1969-1972. Not commercially produced.
 PP-91-01 "Kedr-B" (ПП-91-01 «Кедр-Б») - SMG with an integrated silencer, chambered for 9×18mm Makarov
 PP-9 "Klin" (ПП-9 "Клин") chambered for 9×18mm Makarov, produced in 1996-2002. for the Interior Ministry. It features improved ballistics (due to a more powerful cartridge), the increased weight of the gate and the presence of helical grooves in the chamber.
 PP-919 "Kedr-2" (ПП-919 "Кедр-2") - was developed in 1994-1996. chambered for 9×19mm Parabellum for the Federal Tax Police Service (made 3 pcs.).
 in 2009 was also presented a prototype of the PP-2011 "KEDR-PARA" (ПП-2011 "КЕДР-PARA") chambered for 9×19mm 7N21.
 PKSK (ПКСК) - semi-automatic carbine version chambered for 9×17 mm K, designed for private security, with a 10-round magazine. Produced in small batches since April 1998.
 KMO-9 "Korsak" (КМО-9 "Корсак") - prototype semi-automatic version with a long barrel chambered for 9×21mm. Designed as a civilian sporting and hunting weapons training.
 PST "Corporal" (ПСТ "Капрал") - semi-automatic version for private security agencies chambered for the 10 × 23mm T cartridge, with a 10-round magazine.
 PDT-9T "Yesaul" (ПДТ-9Т "Есаул") - semi-automatic version chambered for the non-lethal 9mm P.A., with a 10-round magazine (available since 2005).
 "Yesaul-2" ("Есаул-2") - a prototype full-automatic version chambered for the non-lethal 9mm P.A., with a 20-round magazine
 PDT-13T "Yesaul-3" (ПДТ-13Т "Есаул-3") - semi-automatic version chambered for the non-lethal .45 Rubber, with a 10-round magazine (designed in 2009)
 "Kedr-MD" (Кедр-МД) - sub-machine gun to fire only blank cartridges, designed to order by the film concern "Mosfilm" in 2006. Only 5 were made.
KSO-9 "Krechet" (КСО-9 "Кречет") -  semi-automatic civilian carbine variant with long barrel, AR-15 type stock, 10-round magazines and chambered for the 9x19mm cartridge. Saw limited production in 2014-2015, very few were made.

Users

: MVD (politsiya and OMON) and security guards

See also
 List of Russian weaponry

References

External links

External links
Official website
 Kedr PP-91 / Klin PP-9 submachine gun - Modern Firearms

9×18mm Makarov submachine guns
Kalashnikov Concern products
Machine pistols
Simple blowback firearms
Submachine guns of Russia
Weapons and ammunition introduced in 1994